Teruhiko (written: ,  or ) is a masculine Japanese given name. Notable people with the name include:

, Japanese swimmer
, Japanese politician
, Japanese sport wrestler
, Japanese singer and actor

Japanese masculine given names